GU10 may refer to:

 A bi-pin connector for light bulbs
 GU10 (album) from Global Underground
 Global Underground 010: Athens, a mix album by Danny Tenaglia
 Part of the GU postcode area within Surrey, England